The 2015 V de V Challenge Monoplace was a multi-event motor racing championship for open wheel, formula racing cars held across Europe. The championship features drivers competing in 2 litre Formula Renault single seat race cars that conform to the technical regulations for the championship. The 2015 season was the sixth V de V Challenge Monoplace season organized by the V de V Sports. The season began at Circuit de Barcelona-Catalunya on 22 March and finishes on 10 October at Circuit de Nevers Magny-Cours.

The season was dominated by RC Formula driver David Droux who won 15 from 17 races. Julien Falchero lost 185.5 points to Droux and finished as runner-up. Gilles Heriau completed the top three in the standings. Riccardo Cazzaniga, Charly Bizalion, Alexandre Jouannem, Aleksey Chuklin and Xavier Benecchi were the other drivers who was able to finish on podium during the races.

Teams and drivers

Race calendar and results

Drivers' Championship

References

External links

V de V Challenge Monoplace
V de V Challenge Monoplace
V de V Challenge Monoplace